Shurestan may refer to:

Shurestan, Ardabil
Shurestan, Razavi Khorasan
Shurestan, South Khorasan
Shurestan-e Olya, Qazvin
Shurestan-e Olya, Razavi Khorasan
Shurestan-e Sofla, Qazvin
Shurestan-e Sofla, Razavi Khorasan